Joanne Nicole Mills (born 18 December 1969) is an Australian golfer, and former player on the Ladies European Tour.

Mills was born in Sydney, New South Wales. As an amateur, she won the 1991 New South Wales Strokeplay Championship, the 1992 Tasmanian Strokeplay Championship, and the 1993 Victoria Strokeplay Championship. After turning professional in 1993, she won the 1997 Ladies' German Open, and, ten years later in 2007, the S4/C Wales Ladies Championship of Europe. She also played on the LPGA Tour from 2002 to 2005.

Mills's father, Greg Mills, is a former secretary of the Ladies' Golf Union in the UK, and was the former CEO of Golf New South Wales.

Professional wins

Ladies European Tour wins
1997 Ladies' German Open
2007 S4/C Wales Ladies Championship of Europe

ALPG Tour wins
1999 Betta Electrical Bega Ladies Classic
2000 Mandeni Ladies Plate
2001 Bega Ladies Classic
2002 Bega Ladies Classic
2006 LG Bing Lee Women's NSW Open
2008 Optus World Coraki Pro-Am
2010 St Georges Basin Country Club Pro-Am

Team appearances
Amateur
Espirito Santo Trophy: (representing Australia): 1992
Tasman Cup (representing Australia): 1993 (winners)
Queen Sirikit Cup (representing Australia): 1993

External links

Australian female golfers
ALPG Tour golfers
Ladies European Tour golfers
LPGA Tour golfers
Golfers from Sydney
Sportswomen from New South Wales
1969 births
Living people